Acleris proximana is a species of moth of the family Tortricidae. It is found in South Korea and China.

The wingspan is about 15 mm.

References

Moths described in 1927
proximana
Moths of Asia